In generative grammar and related approaches, the logical form (LF) of a linguistic expression is the variant of its syntactic structure which undergoes semantic interpretation. It is distinguished from phonetic form, the structure which corresponds to a sentence's pronunciation. These separate representations are postulated in order to explain the ways in which an expression's meaning can be partially independent of its pronunciation, e.g. scope ambiguities. 

LF is the cornerstone of the classic generative view of the syntax-semantics interface. However, it is not used in Lexical Functional Grammar and Head-Driven Phrase Structure Grammar, as well as some modern variants of the generative approach.

Syntax interfacing with semantics 
The notion of Logical Form was originally invented for the purpose of determining quantifier scope. As the theory around the Minimalist program developed, all output conditions, such as theta-criterion, the case filter, Subjacency and binding theory, are examined at the level of LF. The study of LF is more broad than the study of syntax.

The notion of scope 

The scope of an operator is the domain within which it has the ability to affect the interpretation of other expressions. In other words, an operator has scope of operation, or affecting the interpretation of other phrases, only within its own domain. Three uncontroversial examples of scope affecting some aspect of the interpretation are: quantifier-quantifier, quantifier-pronoun, quantifier-negative polarity item.

In instances where a negation has an indefinite article in its scope, the reader's interpretation is affected. The reader is not able to infer the existence of a relevant entity. If negation (or a negation phrase) is within the subject quantifier scope, negation is not affected by the quantifier.
If the Quantified Expresstion1 (QE1) is in the domain of QE2, but not vice versa, QE1 must take a narrow scope; if both are in the domain of the other, the structure is potentially ambiguous. If neither QE is in the domain of the other, they must be interpreted independently. These assumptions explain the cases where the direct object of the main clause is not within the domain of the embedded subject. For example, that every boy left upset a teacher, it cannot be interpreted as for every boy, there is a possibly different teacher who was upset by the fact that the boy left. The only available interpretation is that one single teacher was upset.

Ambiguity motivation 

In syntax, LF exists to give a structural account of certain kinds of semantic ambiguities.

Example 

 Everyone loves someone.

This sentence is semantically ambiguous. Specifically, it contains a scope ambiguity. This ambiguity cannot be resolved at surface structure, since someone, being within the verb phrase, must be lower in the structure than everyone. This case exemplifies the general fact that natural language is insufficiently specified for strict logical meaning. Robert May argued for the postulation of LF partly in order to account for such ambiguities (among other motivations). At LF, the sentence above would have two possible structural representations, one for each possible scope-reading, in order to account for the ambiguity by structural differentiation. In this way it is similar in purpose to, but not the same as, logical form in logic.

Quantification

Key historical developments
There has been discussion about quantification since the 1970s. In 1974, Richard Montague argued that a grammar for a small fragment of English contains the logicosyntactic and semantic devices to handle practically any scope phenomenon. The tool that he mainly relied on is categorical syntax with functional application; in terms of recent formulations, it can be considered Minimalist syntax with Merge only. However, this approach does not make predictions for some examples with inverse scope (wide scope in object position).

For example, everyone loves someone.

When there is no scope interaction in the relevant portion of the sentence, making either choice shows no difference in semantics.

A short time later, May suggested a different idea. In contrast to Montague, May did not propose any syntax that generates the surface string. He proposed a rule called Quantifier Raising (QR), which explains that movement operations of wh-movement continue to operate on the level of LF, and each phrase continues to possess the quantifier in its domain. May suggested that QR applies to all quantifier phrases with no exception.

The study of Quantification carried on in the 1980s. In contrast to May and Montague, it was suggested that independently motivated phrase structure, such as the relative clause, imposes a limitation on scope options.

This clause boundedness somewhat restricts the QR. May also noticed a subject-object asymmetry with respect to the interaction of wh-words and quantifier phrases. A modified version of his past work that QR determines quantifier scope but does not disambiguate it was brought up. To regulate the interaction, The Scope Principle that if two operators govern each other, they can be interpreted in either scopal order was also brought up. However, this solution has eventually been abandoned.

As Minimalism showed up in the 1990s, more studies have been related to Minimalist syntax. A strategy to remedy the situation is to eliminate QR and the expected scope would be by-products of entirely independent grammatical processes. The other strategy is to modify QR and show it can be fitted into a Minimalist structure.

Quantificational noun phrases
Danny Fox discusses syntactic positions of QNPs as a way of introducing and illustrating the basic semantic and syntactic relations found in LF. By looking at the meaning of QNPs in relation to the property they are given, or their predicate, we can derive the meaning of the whole sentence.

To understand the Logical Form of these examples, it is important to identify what the basic predicate is and which segments make up the QNPs. In these examples, the predicate is tall and the QNPs are a girl, many girls, every girl and no girl. The logical meaning of these sentences indicates that the property of being tall is attributed to some form of the QNP referring to girl. Along with the QNP and the predicate, there is also an inference of truth value. Either the truth value is True for a person who is tall, otherwise the truth value is False.

Each of the examples above will have different conditions that make the statement true according to the quantifier that precedes girl.

In a syntactic tree, the structure is represented as such: "the argument of a QNP is always the sister of the QNP."

Wh-movement 
In linguistics, wh-phrases are operators binding variables at LF, like other quantifier noun phrases. Scope interpretations can be constrained by syntactic constraints as shown in LF when regarding the scope of wh-phrases and quantifiers. When wh-movement is from the subject position it is unambiguous, but when wh-movement is from the object position it is ambiguous.

Examples 

This example demonstrates the effect of the Path Containment Condition (PCC). An A'-path is a line of dominating nodes that go from the trace to a c-commanding A'-binder. If two of the A'paths intersect then one must be contained in the other. If the paths are overlapping without having one being contained in the other, then it is ill-formed. (2)'s paths are overlapping, violating PCC, therefore in order to obtain a grammatical LF structure, everything needs to join the VP. The LF structure then becomes:

Cross-linguistic examples

Hungarian 

In the sentence, "Five doctors prescribed few new pills to every patient.", the scope in Hungarian is largely disambiguated by the linear order of quantifiers on the surface. Two facts that should be kept in mind are (1) the linear order is not obtained by putting quantifiers together in the desired order, which contradicts the predictions made by Montague or May's theory; (2) the linear order is not determined by case or grammatical functions, which supports the prediction of Hornstein's theory.

Chinese 

The significance of A-chains has been emphasized in the Chinese language. Scope in Chinese is disambiguated by case positions in some examples.  In this example, the active sentence only has subject wide scope, but the passive sentence is ambiguous. The active sentence only has one interpretation: 
if there are two women who read every book, which is in the subject wide scope. According to Aoun and Li, Chinese does not have VP-internal subjects, thus, liangge nuren cannot be reconstructed in LF. So the sentence has no ambiguous interpretation. However, the passive sentence has two interpretations, 1. everyone finds the same two clues; 2. everyone finds two clues, while two clues can be different ones. That is because liangge xiansuo is in VP-internal complement position, then in LF, it can be reconstructed. So the passive sentence has two different interpretations.

English 

This phrase is ambiguous in that it can be interpreted as the noun 'boy' referring to a particular individual or to a different individual for each instance of 'tree' under the quantifier 'every'. The interpretation that a single boy climbed all the trees takes a wide scope, while the other interpretation that for every tree there is a boy, who maybe be different for each tree takes a narrow scope.

See also 
Scope (formal semantics)
Antecedent-contained deletion
Categorial grammar
Government and binding theory (precursor to the minimalist program)
Logic form

References

Bibliography

External links 
 SEP entry for Logical Form (general concept) covers LF in the Transformational Grammar section

Semantics
Linguistics
Grammar
Generative syntax
Syntax–semantics interface
Syntactic transformation
Formal semantics (natural language)